Ryan Gander OBE  RA (born 1976) is a British artist. Gander is a wheelchair user who does not identify as being disabled. He explains: "I don't even feel disabled. I've spent my whole life trying not to be disabled, so I don't want to be labelled a "disabled artist." Since 2003, Gander has produced a body of artworks in different forms, ranging from sculpture, apparel, writing, architecture, painting, typefaces, publications, and performance. Additionally, Gander curates exhibitions, has worked as an educator at art institutions and universities, and has written and presented television programmes on and about contemporary art and culture for the BBC.

Gander is typically described as a conceptual artist, but this is a term he has refuted, referring instead to himself as "a sort of neo-conceptualist, Proper-'Gander'-ist, amateur philosopher". He was elected Royal Academician in the category of sculpture. Gander's work has been displayed in several different countries.

Early life and education
Gander was born in 1976 in Chester, northwest England. His father worked as a planning engineer on the commercial gearbox line at Vauxhall Motors in Ellesmere Port, Liverpool (a fact about which he would later make work). Gander's mother worked initially as a teacher and then as an inspector for Her Majesty's Inspectorate of Education. Gander became interested in art after being taken to one of the early British Art Shows by his father.

In 1996, Gander began the BA (Hons) Interactive Arts at Manchester Metropolitan University, graduating with a First Class Degree in 1999. He told the artist Cory Arcangel in a 2018 interview, "At that time, there weren't any galleries in Manchester, so I only knew art through magazines and early internet. Dial up stuff, which was quite laborious, and I would have a yearly trip to London to go to the Tate ... I didn't know where else to go, so I always saw art as an image, a caption, a text about it, a title, a view."

After graduating from art school he went to work in a carpet shop in Chester before attempting to train as a journalist at North Wales Newspapers. Although employed briefly as a photographer, he was rejected as a journalist because his writing "was too bad". Asked when he knew he wanted to be an artist, Gander replied: "I didn't think I'd be an artist. It sounds horrible and crass, but to be totally honest I thought I'd be a TV presenter".

Between 1999 and 2000, he was an artist-in-residence at the Jan van Eyck Akademie in Maastricht, Netherlands, as a Fine Art Research Participant. In 2001 he participated in the artist residency programme of the Rijksakademie van Beeldende Kunsten in Amsterdam, also in the Netherlands, finishing in 2002. In 2004, he was made Cocheme Fellow at Byam Shaw School of Art, London.

It was winning the 2005 Baloise Art Prize at Art Basel for the presentation of his video work Is this Guilt in You Too (The Study of a Car in a Field) that launched Gander's career as an artist. The cash prize of CHF 30,000 enabled him to quit three part-time teaching posts to concentrate on his practice.

Work

Ryan Gander's body of work is vast and pluralistic. The critic Philipp Hindahl wrote in Mousse Magazine: "Gander creates output so diverse that it sometimes is impossible to tell if you are seeing a show by the British artist or a well-curated group show." This approach is exemplified in his major commission with Artangel titled Locked Room Scenario (2011), in which the visitor enters a totally designed office space in a former trading depot where they are invited to solve the mystery of a group show of fictionalised artists, including their work, to which they are denied access.

No style style
Gander's work is not invested in any medium or style as such. Suspicious of the positive link between artistic style, medium and work, Gander has cultivated a "non-style" that enables him to pursue ideas across many traditionally understood artistic media. Gander stated:

However, across this work there are preoccupations that Gander returns to: legacies of modernist design, aesthetic value, creativity and education, para-possible and fictional (utopian and dystopian) worlds, and the relationship between art and design.

The work It Came out of Nowhere, he said staring at an empty space (2012) is a Comme des Garçons document wallet made collaboratively with the artist Jonathan Monk. His series of works titled Device #5 (2005) might be functional devices but actually are not. His installation at dOCUMENTA (13) titled I need some meaning I can memorise (The Invisible Pull) (2012) presented an empty room with a light breeze circulating. In 2015, Gander erected "The artist's second phone", a giant billboard installed outside Lisson Gallery, London, which borrows the aesthetic of vacant Mexican billboards to announce his phone number to all passing. The series of works "A lamp made by the artist for his wife" (2013) are ad hoc combinations of products available from most hardware stores to produce a functioning item of furniture. Recently, Gander has increasingly used vending machines to distribute works. At frieze art fair 2019 Time Well Spent (2019) dispensed pebbles for £500 a piece.

Collision and association
Gander's fascination with techniques of creative and associative collisions is evident in his earliest 'Loose Association' public lecturers, begun in 2002, and published together in 2007 as the book Loose Associations and Other Lectures. These lectures range across material, from meditations on the film Back to the Future to the writing of Italo Calvino, modernism to children's books. Motifs of association and collision are evident across his works and he has explored techniques of association used by earlier modernist artists and architects, notably Luis Barragán and Ernö Goldfinger. With the sculptural series The Way Things Collide (2012–ongoing), Gander collides two elements that are hardest to be associated logically with the human mind. Each is a game, a challenge, with narrative consequences. A knotted condom is left on a USM cabinet; a skate wing rests on a suitcase; a macaroon balances on a stool. These are experiments in minimum constituents of narrative.

Creativity
Gander believes that everyone makes creative decisions in their daily life and can be a creative artist. These everyday acts of creativity, he argues, are often more exciting than the creative artworks of celebrated contemporary artists, whose repetition of a successful formula is contrary to creativity. Art for Gander is about "trying to make some original contribution to human history and knowledge, like an explorer".

To avoid habitualised ways of working, Gander has looked to children's creativity, frequently collaborating with his daughters to realise artworks. Likewise, since the early 2000s he has used an array of pseudonyms to produce work outside of his typical concerns. These fictional characters spread across an increasingly growing web of citation and cross-reference, self-corroborating and self-sustaining fictional and possible historical events. In 2014, Gander told an interviewer that: 'I hope my work is [...] expansive or "multiplicit" (that is not a word but it should be). An objective is that the work has more end points than starting points – like a 1970s children's 'Choose your own adventure story''. An influential book Gander has referred to in several interviews is Edward Packer's Choose Your Own Adventure books, first published in 1976, and marketed to 10 to 14 year olds. In these books the reader begins at page one, follows instructions at the foot of the page to turn to page two, from where instructions at the foot of that page motivates a decision that splits the narrative.

Disability-related works
Gander is a wheelchair user with a long-term physical disability,  a severe brittle bone condition which hospitalised him for long periods of time as a child. In 2006, his installation at the old Whitechapel Library, Is this Guilt in you too?, where he filled the space with obstacles, detritus, dead ends, and illusions meant to confound visitors and symbolize the inequitable difficulties faced by disabled people, was part of the Arts Council England's Adjustments exhibitions whose aim was "to address transitional thinking on disability, equality and inclusion". His work for the 2011 Venice Biennale exhibition featured an action-figure sized sculpture that represents him while he falls from a wheelchair.

Despite various interviews and works made in which Gander explicitly states he does not understand himself to be disabled or "differently abled" to anyone else, his work is interpreted, often by able-bodied commentators, as that of a disabled artist. The curator Matthew Higgs, for example, has argued that his disability contributes to his unique way of seeing: "The first thing I ever noticed about Ryan was that he uses a wheelchair. I mention this not in passing, nor as a gratuitous aside. Whilst I accept that some people might argue that this information is irrelevant, I would like to think that the fact that Ryan uses a wheelchair does – at least – have some bearing on my subsequent understanding of his work."

In recent years, Gander has felt compelled to address his disability in order to correct other people's perception of his exceptionalism as a wheelchair user. In the BBC television programme Me, My Selfie and I with Ryan Gander, broadcast in 2019, Gander met a transhumanist who suggests that him he might be "improved" too by replacing his legs with bionic ones modelled on cheetahs. Gander replies: "Being in a wheelchair doesn't affect my view on the world. In an age where everyone identifies with being different, I am someone who actually can't walk and don't associate with being disabled. I don't tick the Arts Council funding box that says 'disabled' because I don't identify ... I don't want cheetah legs. I don't know any cheetahs."

In his work The End (2020) an animatronic mouse poking its head through a gallery wall it's burrowed through elaborates further on the capturing of difference, voicing the opinion of the artist:

Public sculpture
Ryan Gander has been commissioned to produce public art works for a range of sites, including Central Park, USA, Karlsaue Park, Kassel, Germany, Mexico City Zoo, The Metropolitan Cathedral of Christ the King, Liverpool, and Cambridge Biomedical Campus.

In 2010, Gander's sculpture The Happy Prince was commissioned by the Public Art Fund for Central Park, New York City. This concrete resin sculpture presented the ruin of the fictional statue from the final chapter in Oscar Wilde's children's book The Happy Prince (1888). The first of an ongoing number of public sculptures, Gander noted in an interview with The White Review magazine that he'd become disillusioned with contemporary art's institutions and felt public art was a new challenge:

Two years later, in 2012, Gander was commissioned to produce Escape hatch to Culturefield, situated within a wooded area of the Karlslaue Park, Kassel, Delaware, as part of dOCUMENTA 13. Off the park's designated paths, a trapdoor fabricated from iron and concrete appeared to lead to an underground series of tunnels of some kind. The hatch, visibly partially open so that the spectator might partially peer inside, showed ladder rungs leading down. The same year, Gander's work It's got such good heart in it was commissioned by Mexico City Zoo and located in the 'activity centre' for lions. Based on Sol LeWitt's open cube structure – and the story that LeWitt allowed his cats to use his redundant sculpture – upscaled and added to, it was offered as a climbing frame and scratching post for lions.

In 2018, Gander produced two public artworks, the first sited outside BALTIC gallery, Newcastle and the second outside The Metropolitan Cathedral of Christ the King, Liverpool as part of the Liverpool Biennial. In the former, titled To Give Light (Northern Aspirational Charms), ten minimal, simplified forms based on ten objects originally designed to emit or shine light were cast in black concrete and arranged chronologically in a circular configuration. Each element featured three links of mooring chain attached, implying a nautical functionality as well as alluding to trinkets on an oversized charm bracelet. The latter, titled From five minds of great vision (The Metropolitan Cathedral of Christ the King disassembled and reassembled to conjure resting places in the public realm), consisted of five public artworks, functional as benches, placed in a circle in the public square outside the cathedral. Each artwork was enlarged and reproduced from a maquette made by a child from Knotty Ash Primary using building blocks that, when rearranged, made a model of the cathedral.

In 2019, Gander was commissioned to produce a public sculpture by Cambridge Biomedical Campus. Titled The Green & The Gardens, Gander led a concept that transformed the space into a green heart of the campus, a shared place for everyone. In collaboration with Gillespies, landscape architects, they developed the design, selected the planting, furniture and lighting. Gander integrated sculptural elements: coloured tents that glow at night, an open gateway, a stile, and a community noticeboard.

Other public artworks include: We are only human (Incomplete sculpture for Scraborough to be finished by snow) (2022) at Scarborough Castle, UK; Ghost Ship (2022) in Sunderland City Centre, UK; Our Long Dotted Line (or 37 years previous) (2021) at Space K, Korea; The day to day accumulation of hope, failure and ecstasy – The zenith of your career (The Last Degas) (2017), exhibited in the gardens of The Contemporary Austin Commission (USA), in late Autumn, 2018; Because editorial is costly (2016), a giant, swollen, mirror-finish stainless steel version of "Rapport de volumes" (1919) by Georges Vantongerloo in a crater as if crash landed exhibited during the Okayama Art Summit (JP); Dad's Halo Effect (2014), three polished stainless steel sculptures initially conceived by the artist's father when he worked at General Motors in the 1980s, and based on parts of the steering mechanism of a commercial Bedford truck, re-imagined by the artist from his father's verbal description; No political motivation (2012), a faithful reproduction of the revolving New Scotland Yard sign constructed to display the words 'THE WORLD S FAIR', incorrectly typeset with a half space between the characters 'D' and 'S' – meaning the sign could be interpreted in one of two differing ways, as an advertisement for an event or as a political slogan. Based at Museo Tamayo, Mexico City, Mexico.

Curatorial
Gander has curated, by himself and in collaboration, numerous exhibitions, including, notably, "The way in which it landed" at Tate Britain, London, UK in 2008, featuring Lucy Clout, Nathaniel Mellors, Aurelien Froment, David Renggli, and Carol Bove; 'Young British Art' at Limoncello, London, UK in 2011 featuring 70 emerging artist; "Night in the Museum" to celebrate the 70th anniversary of the Arts Council collection, which toured to The Attenborough Centre, Leicester, UK, Longside Gallery, Yorkshire Sculpture Park, Yorkshire, UK, and Birmingham Museum and Art Gallery, Birmingham, UK; 'The Greatest Story Ever Told', The National Museum of Art Osaka, Osaka, JP in 2017; "Knock Knock" at South London Gallery, London, UK, 2018. "The Annotated Reader", a publication and exhibition, curated with art critic Jonathan P. Watts, is touring the world. In 2016, Gander also collaborated with Watts on "general studies" at OUTPOST, Norwich, a "service" that offered artist-designed Airbnb rooms available to rent cheaply during the British Art Show.

Television
Gander first made an appearance on BBC Two in 2012 on an episode of The Culture Show. The following year, in 2015, "The Art of Everything", presented by Miranda Sawyer, explored 'the extraordinary diversity of Gander's art, spanning sculptures that tinker with art history, chess sets made from car parts, fantastical cocktails and even designer trainers'. In 2016, BBC Two broadcast Ryan Gander: Living is a Creative Act. In 2017, Gander appeared on Sky Arts' The Art Show. That same year BBC Four presented Ryan Gander: The Idea of Japan, which took him "six thousand miles east of his Suffolk studio, to investigate how Japanese visual culture is closely linked to a special relationship with time, as the country's past and future inform its present tense". This was followed in 2019 by Me, My Selfie and I with Ryan Gander, which "investigates the selfie – the icon of a new kind of self-regard that hardly existed just ten years ago". The programme was critically acclaimed with The Guardian newspaper's Eleanor Morgan noting that "Gander's lines of questioning make for compelling viewing."

Teaching
Between 2003 and 2004, Gander taught Fine Art part-time at Sheffield Institute of Arts, Leeds College of Art and Manchester Metropolitan University. Gander was Professor of Visual Art at the University of Huddersfield. In 2004, he was awarded the Cocheme Fellowship at Byam Shaw School of Art, London.

Subsequently, alongside his artistic practice, Gander has continued to be a visiting lecturer in a range of leading international institutions, including the AA School of Architecture, London, UK; the Royal College of Art, London, UK; École nationale des beaux-arts, Lyon, France; The New School, New York, US; University of Southern California, US; Fudan University, Shanghai, China; and The Royal Danish Academy of Art, School of Architecture, Copenhagen, Denmark. In 2019, he began a Hodder Fellowship at the Lewis Center for the Arts at Princeton University, an award given to artists and writers of exceptional promise to pursue independent projects at Princeton University during the academic year.

Gander has previously served as a trustee of South London Gallery, London, Grizdale Arts, Liverpool Biennial, Open School East, as well as sitting on Tate Modern Council and Tate Members Council. Gander is currently a patron of Castlefield Gallery, Manchester and part of the Arts Council England Collection Acquisition Committee.

Fairfield International and residency programme
In 2013, Gander and creative consultant Simon Turnbull proposed plans to open Fairfield International, a residential art school in a former primary school in Saxmundham, Suffolk. Modelled on a hybrid of the Dutch academy and artist residency, Fairfield International would provide six residencies a year to hard-up artists in need of a retreat.

With no fees, students would receive a living stipend to participate in a non-instrumentalised, non-qualification approach to art education, foregrounding the work itself, minimising competitiveness of the British, particularly London-based, art school system. 'I think there are artists who come from situations that hold no other prerogative than to practice art. That sort of freedom is rare,' Gander told Artforum in 2013. Continuing, he said: 'I think that when one is in a situation in which they don't have to worry about time and space – two of the greatest denominators in an artist's ability to practice – that's when someone starts acting like a real artist. When you give young brilliant artists some time and space, everything else becomes contributing factors to their work.'

Despite raising funds for Fairfield International, the project was cancelled in 2015 due to a combination of factors, which Gander has written about in his book Fieldwork: 'the bureaucracy of dealing with the county council over the purchase of the building' and 'the presence of something called "knotweed" on the site'. At the time insurers would not offer indemnity against sites with knotweed.

Recently, in 2020, Gander has begun publicly discussing his desire to open a residency programme in a village in Suffolk where his studio complex is situated. In a feature for the Suffolk Magazine he explained that he would make accommodation and studio space available for three artists for three months at a time. 'There are so many artists,' he told the magazine, 'with incredible potential but very limited means, so I would invite them to live and work here for free.'

Awards and honours
Since 2001, Gander has been the recipient of numerous prestigious prizes and honours for contemporary art. Including the following:

 Arts Council of England International Fellowship, UK (2001 to 2003); 
 Prix De Rome for Sculpture, NL (2003); 
 Beck's Futures Shortlist, ICA, London, UK (2005); 
 BN AMRO Prize, NL (2006); 
 Baloise Art Prize Statements, Basel Art Fair, CH (2006); 
 DENA Foundation Art Award, FR (2007); 
 Paul Hamlyn Award, UK (2008); 
 Zurich Art Prize, from Haus Konstruktiv (2010); 
 Pommery Prize (2019)

In 2017, Gander was appointed Officer of the Order of the British Empire (OBE) in the New Year Honours for services to contemporary art. In 2022, Gander was made RA Elect for the category of Sculpture.

Publications
Transformers, exhibition catalogue "Transformers. Masterpieces of the Frieder Burda Collection in Dialogue with Artificial Beings", Museum Frieder Burda, Baden-Baden, 2023 
The Future, Dent-de-Leone, 2021  
The Rates of Change, Space K, 2021 
Ryan Gander, Leporello N° 04, Il’Editions, 2021, 
Stabs at Academia with Painters Tools, Morel Books, 2019
The Annotated Reader, Dente-de-Leone, 2019 
Picasso and I, Remai Modern, 2019
Soft Modernism, Gallery Hyundai, 2017
Ryan Gander – These wings aren't for flying, The National Museum of Art, 2017
Ryan Gander: Night in the Museum, Hayward Gallery Publishing, 2016
Fieldwork, the Complete Reader, Bedford Press, 2016
Fieldwork An Incomplete Reader, Plazzy Banter, 2016
Culturefield, Koenig Books, 2014 
The boy Who Always Looked Up, Lisson Gallery, reprinted 2014 
Artists' Cocktails, Dente-de-Leone, 2013 
The Viewing Room: Volume 14. These are the things I don't understand, Daiwa Press, 2013
Ampersand, Dente-de-Leone, 2013 
Le dit du dé, Villa Arson, les presses du réel, 2012 
Catalogue Raisonnable Vol: 1, co-published by JRP Ringier and Westreich/Wagner Publications, 2010 
Heralded as the New Black, Ikon Gallery, 2008 
Appendix Appendix – A Proposal for a TV Series, JRP Ringier, 2007 
Intellectual Colours, Silvana Editoriale and Dena Foundation of Contemporary Art, 2007
Loose Associations and other lectures, Onestar Press, 2007
Pure Associations, ABN AMRO Art Collection, 2006
Appendix, Artimo, 2003

Personal life
Gander is married to the former director of the Limoncello gallery, Rebecca May Marston, with whom he has two daughters and one son.

References

External links
 
 Online archive

People from Chester
1976 births
English contemporary artists
Living people
People from Cheshire
Bâloise Prize winners
Officers of the Order of the British Empire
Artists with disabilities
Royal Academicians